Ulyanovsk Vostochny Airport (sometimes referred to as Ul'yanovsk or Ulyanovsk Northeast)  is an airport in Russia located  northeast of Ulyanovsk in Russia. The airport also features a very long taxiway that connects to the local Aviastar plant.
This airport is mainly a cargo airport. It was founded in 1983 as a test site for the neighbouring Aviastar plant. It is a base for Volga-Dnepr Airlines. Also located here is Aviastar-SP, the manufacturer of the Antonov An-124 and Tupolev Tu-204.

In March 2012, Russian foreign minister Sergei Lavrov offered Ulyanovsk Vostochny Airport for NATO use as a hub for non-lethal cargo and for ferrying personnel.

See also
 Ulyanovsk Baratayevka Airport
 Samara Kurumoch Airport

References

 ASN Accident history for UWLW

Airports built in the Soviet Union
Airports in Ulyanovsk Oblast